The following is an alphabetical list of articles related to the U.S. state of Arizona.

0–9 

 .az.us – Internet second-level domain for the state of Arizona
 4 Corners
 4 Corners Monument
 4 Peaks
 7-Eleven
 32nd meridian west from Washington
 32nd parallel north
 33rd parallel north
 34th parallel north
 35th parallel north
 36th parallel north
 37 Geminorum
 37th meridian west from Washington
 37th parallel north
 50 State Quarters
 110th meridian west
 111th meridian west
 112th meridian west
 113th meridian west
 114th meridian west

A

 Abert's squirrel
 Acacia greggii
 Aerospace Maintenance and Regeneration Center
 Africanized bee
 Agave deserti
 All-American Canal
 American Old West
 Anasazi
 Araucarioxylon arizonicum
 Arcosanti
 Area codes in Arizona
 Arizona
 Arizona bark scorpion
 Arizona Cactus Botanical Garden
 Arizona Canal
 Arizona Cardinals
 Arizona desert centipede
 Arizona Conservatory for Arts and Academics
 Arizona cypress
 Arizona Department of Public Safety
 Arizona Department of Transportation
 Arizona Diamondbacks
 Arizona firecracker
 Arizona Game and Fish Department
 Arizona Highways (magazine)
 Arizona League Mexico
 Arizona Medical Training Institute
 Arizona Native Plant Society
 Arizona Native Plant Society
 Arizona Rattlers
 Arizona Saves
 Arizona State Capitol
 Arizona State Parks
 Arizona State Route 66
 Arizona State University
 ASU School of Sustainability
 Arizona Sting
 Arizona Strip
 Arizona Territory
 Arizona Veterans Memorial Coliseum
 Arizona Western College
 Arizona woodpecker
 Arizonasaurus
 Arizona-Sonora Desert Museum
 Aspen Fire
 Art museums and galleries in Arizona
 commons:Category:Art museums and galleries in Arizona
 Astronomical observatories in Arizona
 commons:Category:Astronomical observatories in Arizona
 AZ – United States Postal Service postal code for the state of Arizona

B

 Barringer Crater
 Battle of Apache Pass
 Beaver Dam Mountains Wilderness
 Black Canyon of the Colorado
 Blythe Intaglios
 Bola tie
 Botanical gardens in Arizona
 commons:Category:Botanical gardens in Arizona
 Boyce Thompson Arboretum State Park
 Bright Angel Trail
 Buildings and structures in Arizona
 commons:Category:Buildings and structures in Arizona

C

 Cabeza Prieta National Wildlife Refuge
 Camelback Mountain
 Canada del Oro
 Canyon de Chelly National Monument
 Canyons and gorges of Arizona
 commons:Category:Canyons and gorges of Arizona
 Capital of the state of Arizona
 Capitol of the state of Arizona
 commons:Category:Arizona State Capitol
 Casa Grande Ruins National Monument
 Casinos in Arizona
 Catalina Highway
 Caves of Arizona
 commons:Category:Caves of Arizona
 Cemeteries in Arizona
 Census statistical areas in Arizona
 Central Arizona Museum Association
 Central Arizona Project Aqueduct
 Climate of Arizona
 Climate change in Arizona
 Coconino Plateau
 Collared peccary
 Colorado Desert
 Colorado pinyon
 Colorado Plateau
 Colorado River
 Colorado River Compact
 Colorado River Delta
 Communications in Arizona
 commons:Category:Communications in Arizona
 Confederate Territory of Arizona, 1862–1865
 Convention centers in Arizona
 commons:Category:Convention centers in Arizona
 Copper extraction
 Copper mining in Arizona
 Coronado National Memorial
 Counties of the state of Arizona
 commons:Category:Counties in Arizona
 Cross Rail Ranch
 Cuisine of Arizona
 Culture of Arizona
 :Category:Arizona culture
 commons:Category:Arizona culture
 Cupressus arizonica (Arizona cypress)
 Curve-billed thrasher

D
 Dasylirion wheeleri

 Davis-Monthan Air Force Base
 Aerospace Maintenance and Regeneration Center
 Deck Park Tunnel
 Demographics of Arizona
 Desert bighorn sheep
 Desert iguana
 Desert tortoise
 Desertification
 Deserts and xeric shrublands
 Dendrochronology
 Deserts:
 Colorado Desert
 Lechuguilla Desert
 North American Desert
 Painted Desert, Arizona
 Sonoran Desert
 Tule Desert (Arizona)
 Yuma Desert
 Dry Lake Wind Power Project

E
 Economy of Arizona
 :Category:Economy of Arizona
 commons:Category:Economy of Arizona
 Education in Arizona
 :Category:Education in Arizona
 commons:Category:Education in Arizona
 Elections in the state of Arizona
 commons:Category:Arizona elections
 Entrenched river
 Environment of Arizona
 commons:Category:Environment of Arizona
 European colonization of Arizona

F

 Festivals in Arizona
 commons:Category:Festivals in Arizona
 Flag of the State of Arizona
 Forts of Arizona
 Fort Whipple, first capital of Arizona territory 1864
 :Category:Forts in Arizona
 commons:Category:Forts in Arizona
 Four Corners
 Four Corners Monument
 Four Peaks
 Frye Mesa Reservoir

G

 Gadsden Purchase of 1853
 Geography of Arizona
 :Category:Geography of Arizona
 commons:Category:Geography of Arizona
 Geology of Arizona
 Geology of the Grand Canyon area
 commons:Category:Geology of Arizona
 Get Back
 Ghost towns in Arizona
 :Category:Ghost towns in Arizona
 commons:Category:Ghost towns in Arizona
 Gila monster
 Gila River
 Gila trout
 Gila woodpecker
 Glen Canyon
 Glen Canyon Dam
 Gold cyanidation
 Golf clubs and courses in Arizona
 Government of the state of Arizona  website
 :Category:Government of Arizona
 commons:Category:Government of Arizona
 Governor of the State of Arizona
 List of governors of Arizona
 Grand Canyon
 Grand Canyon Railway
 Grand Canyon–Parashant National Monument
 Great Seal of the State of Arizona
 Great Unconformity
 Gulf of California (Sea of Cortez)

H

 Haboob
 Havasu Falls
 Heritage railroads in Arizona
 commons:Category:Heritage railroads in Arizona
 Hiking trails in Arizona
 commons:Category:Hiking trails in Arizona
 History of Arizona
 Historical outline of Arizona
 :Category:History of Arizona
 commons:Category:History of Arizona
 History of Phoenix, Arizona
 Hoover Dam
 Hoover Dam Bypass
 Hot springs of Arizona
 commons:Category:Hot springs of Arizona
 Hotel San Carlos
 Humphreys Peak

I
 Images of Arizona
 commons:Category:Arizona
 Indigenous peoples in Arizona
 Ipomopsis arizonica (Arizona firecracker)
 Islands in Arizona

J

 James Reavis, The 'Baron of Arizona'
 Jojoba
 Joshua tree
 Jumping Cholla

K
 Kaibab Plateau
 Kaibab squirrel
 Kitt Peak National Observatory

L

 Lakes in Arizona
 Lake Mead
 Lake Powell
 Lechuguilla Desert
 Lee's Ferry
 Lists related to the state of Arizona:
 List of airports in Arizona
 List of birds in Arizona
 List of cemeteries in Arizona
 List of census statistical areas in Arizona
 List of cities in Arizona
 List of colleges and universities in Arizona
 List of Colorado River rapids and features
 List of companies in Arizona
 List of counties in Arizona
 List of county name etymologies in Arizona
 List of county seats in Arizona
 List of dams and reservoirs in Arizona
 List of ghost towns in Arizona
 List of governors of Arizona
 List of high schools in Arizona
 List of highway routes in Arizona
 List of hospitals in Arizona
 List of hurricanes in Arizona
 List of individuals executed in Arizona
 List of islands in Arizona
 List of lakes in Arizona
 List of lava flows in Arizona
 List of law enforcement agencies in Arizona
 List of localities in Arizona
 List of mountain ranges of Arizona
 List of mountains and hills of Arizona by height
 List of museums in Arizona
 List of National Historic Landmarks in Arizona
 List of newspapers in Arizona
 List of North American deserts
 List of people from Arizona
 List of people from Tucson
 List of places in Arizona
 List of power stations in Arizona
 List of private and independent schools in Arizona
 List of radio stations in Arizona
 List of railroads in Arizona
 List of Registered Historic Places in Arizona
 List of Registered Historic Places in Coconino County, Arizona
 List of rivers of Arizona
 List of school districts in Arizona
 List of Sonoran Desert birds (Arizona)
 List of state parks in Arizona
 List of state prisons in Arizona
 List of symbols of the State of Arizona
 List of telephone area codes in Arizona
 List of television stations in Arizona
 List of towns in Arizona
 List of United States congressional delegations from Arizona
 List of United States congressional districts in Arizona
 List of United States representatives from Arizona
 List of United States senators from Arizona
 List of valleys of Arizona
 List of wilderness areas in Arizona
 List of wilderness areas in the Lower Colorado River Valley of Arizona
 Little Colorado River
 London Bridge
 Lost Dutchman's Gold Mine
 Lowell Observatory

M

 Madera Canyon (Arizona)
 Madrean Sky Islands
 Maps of Arizona
 commons:Category:Maps of Arizona
 Marble Canyon
 McKale Center
 Meteor Crater
 Mexican period of Arizona, 1821–1848
 Mike O'Callaghan – Pat Tillman Memorial Bridge
 Mirrorshades Project
 Mission San Xavier del Bac
 Mogollon
 Mogollon Monster
 Mogollon Plateau
 Mogollon Rim
 Mojave rattlesnake
 Monument Valley
 Monuments and memorials in Arizona
 commons:Category:Monuments and memorials in Arizona
 Mormon volcanic field
 Mountains of Arizona
 Mount Graham
 Mount Lemmon
 commons:Category:Mountains of Arizona
 Museums in Arizona
 :Category:Museums in Arizona
 commons:Category:Museums in Arizona
 Music of Arizona
 :Category:Music of Arizona
 commons:Category:Music of Arizona
 :Category:Musical groups from Arizona
 :Category:Musicians from Arizona
 Mystery Castle

N

 National Forests of Arizona
 commons:Category:National Forests of Arizona
 National Monuments of Arizona
 commons:Category:National Monuments in Arizona
 National Parks in Arizona
 commons:Category:National Parks in Arizona
 National Radio Astronomy Observatory
 Native Americans in Arizona
 Natural arches of Arizona
 commons:Category:Natural arches of Arizona
 Natural gas pipelines in Arizona
 Natural history of Arizona
 commons:Category:Natural history of Arizona
 Navajo Bridge
 Navajo Nation (Native American)
 North American Desert
 Northern Arizona University

O

 Ocotillo
 Old Plank Road
 O'odham

P

 Painted lady (butterfly)
 Palo verde, State tree
 Paria Canyon-Vermilion Cliffs Wilderness
 Patayan
 People from Arizona
 :Category:People from Arizona
 commons:Category:People from Arizona
 :Category:People by city in Arizona
 :Category:People by county in Arizona
 :Category:People from Arizona by occupation
 Petrified wood
 Phantom Ranch
 Phoenix, Arizona, territorial and state capital since 1889
 Phoenix (mythology)
 Phoenix Coyotes
 Phoenix Eclipse
 Phoenix Mercury
 Phoenix Municipal Stadium
 Phoenix Sky Harbor International Airport
 Phoenix Suns
 Phoenix Zoo
 Piestewa Peak
 Politics of Arizona
 commons:Category:Politics of Arizona
 Prescott, Arizona, territorial capital 1864–1867 and 1877–1889
 Prickly pear cactus
 Protected areas of Arizona
 commons:Category:Protected areas of Arizona

Q
 Quayle, Ben
 Qauyle, Dan

R
 Railroad museums in Arizona
 commons:Category:Railroad museums in Arizona
 Rattlesnake
 Red Butte
 Religion in Arizona
 :Category:Religion in Arizona
 commons:Category:Religion in Arizona
 Repatriation flight program
 Rock formations in Arizona
 commons:Category:Rock formations in Arizona

S

 Saguaro
 Saguaro National Park
 Salt River Project
 San Francisco Peaks
 San Francisco volcanic field
 San Xavier del Bac Mission
 Scouting in Arizona
 Sea of Cortez (Gulf of California)
 Settlements in Arizona
 Cities in Arizona
 Towns in Arizona
 Census Designated Places in Arizona
 Other unincorporated communities in Arizona
 List of ghost towns in Arizona
 List of places in Arizona
 Shannon's law (Arizona)
 Sierra Madre Occidental pine-oak forests
 Silver mining in Arizona
 Sinagua
 Ski areas and resorts in Arizona
 commons:Category:Ski areas and resorts in Arizona
 Snaketown
 Soaptree yucca
 Solar power in Arizona
 Sonoran Desert 
 Sonorasaurus
 Southwest Extreme Triangle
 Southwestern United States
 Spanish missions in the Sonoran Desert
 Spanish missions in Arizona
 Spanish period of Arizona, 1687–1821
 Sports in Arizona
 commons:Category:Sports in Arizona
 Sports venues in Arizona
 commons:Category:Sports venues in Arizona
 State of Arizona  website
 Government of the state of Arizona
 :Category:Government of Arizona
 commons:Category:Government of Arizona
 Structures in Arizona
 commons:Category:Buildings and structures in Arizona
 Sun Devil Stadium 
 Sunset Crater
 Super Bowl XXVII
 Superfund sites in Arizona
 Symbols of the State of Arizona
 Arizona state amphibian:  Arizona treefrog (Hyla eximia)
 Arizona state bird:  cactus wren (Campylorhynchus brunneicapillus)
 Arizona state butterfly:  two-tailed swallowtail (Papilio multicaudata)
 Arizona state colors:  federal blue and old gold
 Arizona state fish:  Arizona trout (Oncorhynchus gilae apache)
 Arizona state flag:  Flag of the State of Arizona
 Arizona state flower:  saguaro blossom (Carnegiea gigantea)
 Arizona state fossil:  petrified wood
 Arizona state gemstone:  turquoise
 Arizona state mammal:  ringtail (Bassariscus astutus)
 Arizona state motto:  Ditat Deus (Latin for God enriches)
 Arizona state neckwear:  bolo tie
 Arizona state nickname and slogan:  Grand Canyon State
 Arizona state reptile:  Arizona ridge-nosed rattlesnake (Crotalus willardi)
 Arizona state seal:  Great Seal of the State of Arizona
 Arizona state songs:  Arizona March Song and Arizona
 Arizona state tree:  blue palo verde (Parkinsonia florida)
 United States quarter dollar – Arizona 2008:

T

 Tarantula
 Telecommunications in Arizona
 commons:Category:Communications in Arizona
 Telephone area codes in Arizona
 Territory of Arizona, 1863–1912
 Territory of Arizona (CSA), 1861–1865
 Territory of New Mexico, 1850–1863 & 1863–1912
 Texas Canyon
 Theatres in Arizona
 commons:Category:Theatres in Arizona
 Titan Missile Museum
 Tohono O'odham, southern Arizona Nation
 Tourism in Arizona
 commons:Category:Tourism in Arizona
 Transportation in Arizona
 :Category:Transportation in Arizona
 commons:Category:Transport in Arizona
 Treaty of Guadalupe Hidalgo of 1848
 Tucson, Arizona, territorial capital 1867–1877
 Tucson Bird Count
 Tucson Gem & Mineral Show
 Tule Desert (Arizona)
 Turf Paradise

U

 UFO
 United States of America
 States of the United States of America
 United States census statistical areas of Arizona
 United States congressional delegations from Arizona
 United States congressional districts in Arizona
 United States Court of Appeals for the Ninth Circuit
 United States District Court for the District of Arizona
 United States representatives from Arizona
 United States senators from Arizona
 United States-Mexico border
 University of Arizona
 University of Arizona Mineral Museum
 University of Phoenix Stadium
 Uranium mining in Arizona
 U.S. Route 66
 US-AZ – ISO 3166-2:US region code for the state of Arizona
 USS Arizona (BB-39)
 USS Arizona Memorial

V
 Verde Valley

W

 Walnut Canyon National Monument
 Waterfalls in Arizona
 commons:Category:Waterfalls in Arizona
 Western painted lady (butterfly)
 Western United States
 White Mountains (Arizona)
 ;Wikimedia
 Wikimedia Commons:Category:Arizona
 commons:Category:Maps of Arizona
 n:Category:Arizona
 n:Portal:Arizona
 Wikipedia Category:Arizona
 Wikipedia Portal:Arizona
 Wikipedia:WikiProject Arizona
 :Category:WikiProject Arizona articles
 :Category:WikiProject Arizona members
 Wind power in Arizona
 Windsor Hotel
 Wrather Arch

X

 Xavier College Preparatory (Arizona)
 Xeric shrublands and deserts
 Xeriscaping

Y
 Yaqui
 Yucca
 Yuma Desert
 Yuma Territorial Prison
 Yuman
 Yuman music

Z
 Zoos in Arizona
 commons:Category:Zoos in Arizona

See also

 Topic overview:
 Arizona
 Outline of Arizona

 
 
 
 

Arizona
 
Arizona